Pine Lake is a small lake located east of the hamlet of West Davenport in Delaware County, New York. Pine Lake drains south via an unnamed creek which flows into Charlotte Creek.

See also
 List of lakes in New York

References 

Lakes of New York (state)
Lakes of Delaware County, New York